Salaspils Municipality is a municipality in Vidzeme, Latvia. The municipality was formed in 2004 by reorganization of Salaspils town and its rural territory, the administrative centre being Salaspils. In 2010 the rural territory was renamed Salaspils parish. The population in 2020 was 22,758.

Twin towns — sister cities

Patron of the University of Latvia 
Salaspils municipality is a silver patron of the University of Latvia Foundation. Has been supporting the University of Latvia since 2013, when a scholarship was established to support young people in their region who start basic studies in one of Latvia's higher education institutions, fulfilling the criteria, support is provided throughout the basic studies.

Salaspils is twinned with:
 Finspång, Sweden
 Finsterwalde, Germany
 Wieliszew, Poland

See also
 Administrative divisions of Latvia

References

External links
 

 
Municipalities of Latvia
Vidzeme